Rice House may refer to:

in Australia
Rice House (Melbourne), Australia

in the United States

Green Pryor Rice House, Somerville, Alabama, listed on the National Register of Historic Places (NRHP) in Morgan County
Rice House (Bentonville, Arkansas), NRHP-listed in Benton County
James A. Rice House, Bentonville, Arkansas, NRHP-listed in Benton County
Rice-Upshaw House, Dalton, Arkansas, NRHP-listed in Randolph County
Lilian Jenette Rice House, Rancho Santa Fe, California, NRHP-listed in San Diego County
Ida M. Rice House, Colorado Springs, El Paso County, Colorado, NRHP-listed
Ward Rice House, Pueblo, Colorado, listed on the NRHP in Pueblo County
House at 7217 Ventura Avenue, Jacksonville, Florida, also known as the Rice House, NRHP-listed in Duval County
Clifton Rice House, West Palm Beach, Florida, NRHP-listed in Palm Beach County
Strong-Davis-Rice-George House, Eatonton, Georgia, NRHP-listed in Putnam County
John W. Rice Summer Cottage, Smyrna, Georgia, listed on the NRHP in Cobb County
John C. Rice House, Caldwell, Idaho, listed on the NRHP in Canyon County
Rice-Packard House, Pocatello, Idaho, listed on the NRHP in Bannock County
J.R. Rice Farmstead, Cullison, Kansas, listed on the NRHP in Pratt County
Wiley Rice House, Asa, Kentucky, listed on the NRHP in Johnson County
Rice House (Clay Village, Kentucky), listed on the NRHP in Shelby County
Rice-Worthington House, Danville, Kentucky, listed on the NRHP in Boyle County
Rice House (New Orleans, Louisiana), listed on the NRHP in Orleans Parish
Capt. Peter Rice House, Marlborough, Massachusetts, listed on the NRHP in Middlesex County
Ezra Rice House, Worcester, Massachusetts, listed on the NRHP in Worcester County
Rice-Tremonti House, Raytown, Missouri, listed on the NRHP in Jackson County
Hart-Rice House, Portsmouth, New Hampshire, listed on the NRHP in Rockingham County
Larkin-Rice House, Portsmouth, New Hampshire, listed on the NRHP in Rockingham County
Rice Hall (Ithaca, New York), listed on the NRHP in Tompkins County
Oliver Rice House, Mayfield, New York, listed on the NRHP in Fulton County
Isaac L. Rice Mansion, New York, New York, listed on the NRHP in Manhattan County
Clough H. Rice House, Hendersonville, North Carolina, listed on the NRHP in Henderson County
Paisley-Rice Log House, Mebane, North Carolina, listed on the NRHP in Orange County
Silas A. Rice Log House, Condon, Oregon, listed on the NRHP in Gilliam County
Richard and Helen Rice House, Hillsboro, Oregon, listed on the NRHP in Washington County
Rice–Gates House, Hillsboro, Oregon, listed on the NRHP in Washington County
Napoleon Rice House, Roseburg, Oregon, listed on the NRHP in Douglas County
Rice-Pennebecker Farm, Chester Springs, Pennsylvania, listed on the NRHP in Chester County
Rice-Marler House, Decatur, Tennessee, listed on the NRHP in Meigs County
Rice House (Richmond, Virginia), listed on the NRHP in Virginia
L. N. Rice House, Yelm, Washington, listed on the NRHP in Thurston County

See also
Rice Building, Troy, New York
Rice Lofts, Houston, Texas